Brunnström is a surname. Notable people with the surname include:

Fabian Brunnström (born 1985), Swedish ice hockey player
Gösta Brunnström (1907–1989), Swedish diplomat
Signe Brunnström (1898–1988), Swedish-American physiotherapist, scientist, and educator

See also
Brunström